Smokefree RockQuest 2005 is a compilation album featuring the finalists from the 2005 high school "battle of the bands" Rockquest held annually in New Zealand.  This event was held in the Wellington Town Hall on Saturday 3 September 2005.

The judges of this year's event were Anika Moa, Willy McAlistair from The Edge, Tania Deans from NZ on Air, Matt Headland from Warner Music and music producer Malcolm Welsford.

The Electric Confectionaires won the 2005 Smokefreerockquest.  Its members from Auckland's Takapuna Grammar were Haddon Smith (keyboard), Jaisi Sheehan (lead guitar and vocals), Rob Fenton (drums) and Calum Gunn (bass guitarist).  At the time of the event they had been together only about three months.

Their prizes included:
Vouchers for musical equipment to the value of $10,000 from NZ Rock Shops and other suppliers
Recording a song at York St Studio
Air play on The Edge
A NZ On Air grant to produce a music video.

Second place went to another North Shore band, Midnight Youth from Rangitoto College in Mairangi Bay, who received the Rockquest Promotions Best Song Award, worth $500.

Third place was The Legions of Sound from Wanganui High School.

Track listing
 All My Love by The Electric Confectionaires 
Turn The Page by Legions Of Sound 
Friday Conversation by Midnight Youth
Singing With You by Maenad 
Burning by Rival State
Kate by Eight Orange Orchard 
Mrs Julian Casablancas by Priya 
Part Two: The Execution by Cathedra 
Let it Rain by The 44th Calibre 
The Better Tones by The Henderson Experience 
Thoughtful Escape by Kimbra

See also
 Rockquest

References

Compilation albums by New Zealand artists
2005 compilation albums
Rock compilation albums